Vietnam competed at the 2011 Summer Universiade in Shenzhen, China in four sports: athletics, gymnastics, table tennis, and taekwondo.

Medalists

References

Nations at the 2011 Summer Universiade
2011 in Vietnamese sport
Vietnam at the Summer Universiade